George Philip Kazen (February 29, 1940 – April 27, 2021) was a United States federal judge.

Born in Laredo, Texas, Kazen received a Bachelor of Business Administration from the University of Texas in 1960 and a Juris Doctor from the University of Texas School of Law in 1961. He was a briefing attorney for the Texas Supreme Court from 1961 to 1962, and was then a Captain in the U.S. Air Force, JAG Corps, from 1962 to 1965. He was in private practice in Laredo, Texas from 1965 to 1979. 

On March 7, 1979, Kazen was nominated by President Jimmy Carter to a new seat on the United States District Court for the Southern District of Texas created by 92 Stat. 1629. He was confirmed by the United States Senate on May 10, 1979, and received his commission the following day. He served as chief judge from 1996 to 2003, and assumed senior status on May 31, 2009. Kazen has also been an adjunct professor of law at St. Mary's University Law School since 1990. After his retirement in 2018, the federal courthouse in Laredo was renamed in his honor. He died on April 27, 2021, aged 81.

Kazen's uncle, Abraham Kazen, was a Democratic member of the United States House of Representatives from 1967 to 1985.

References

External links
 

1940 births
2021 deaths
20th-century American judges
21st-century American judges
American people of Lebanese descent
Judges of the United States District Court for the Southern District of Texas
Military personnel from Texas
People from Laredo, Texas
Texas lawyers
Texas Democrats
United States district court judges appointed by Jimmy Carter
University of Texas alumni
University of Texas School of Law alumni